Zakharova is a rural locality (a village) in Oshibskoye Rural Settlement, Kudymkarsky District, Perm Krai, Russia. The population was 47 as of 2010.

Geography 
Zakharova is located 39 km north of Kudymkar (the district's administrative centre) by road. Yegorova is the nearest rural locality.

References 

Rural localities in Kudymkarsky District